Parashuram Khapung is a Nepalese politician and current Governor of Koshi Province. He was appointed Governor, as per the Article 163 (2)  of the Constitution of Nepal by the President Bidya Devi Bhandari on the recommendation of the Council of Ministers of the Government of Nepal on 11 November 2021. He is a former member of House of representatives.

Political life 
Before being appointed Governor, he was a member of the People's Socialist Party. He was elected to the House of representatives from Tehrathum 1 in the 1986 Nepalese general election.

References

External links

Governors of Koshi Province
Living people
Year of birth missing (living people)